

BMX racing

BMX World Cup
 April 18 – September 26: 2015 UCI BMX Supercross World Cup
 April 18 & 19: World Cup #1 in  Manchester
 Men's Time Trial winner:  Liam Phillips
 Men's Race winner:  Liam Phillips
 Women's Time Trial winner:  Mariana Pajón
 Women's Race winner:  Caroline Buchanan
 May 9 & 10: World Cup #2 in  Papendal
 Men's Time Trial winner:  Connor Fields
 Men's Race winner:  Niek Kimmann
 Women's Time Trial winner:  Mariana Pajón
 Women's Race winner:  Mariana Pajón
 August 15 & 16: World Cup #3 in  Ängelholm
 Men's Time Trial winner:  Sam Willoughby
 Men's Race winner:  Liam Phillips
 Women's Time Trial winner:  Mariana Pajón
 Women's Race winner:  Alise Post
 September 5 & 6: World Cup #4 in  Santiago del Estero
 Men's Time Trial winner:  Connor Fields
 Men's Race winner:  Liam Phillips
 Women's Time Trial winner:  Mariana Pajón
 Women's Race winner:  Mariana Pajón
 September 25 & 26: World Cup #5 (final) in  Rock Hill, South Carolina
 Men's Time Trial winner:  Niek Kimmann
 Men's Race winner:  Māris Štrombergs
 Women's Time Trial winner:  Mariana Pajón
 Women's Race winner:  Mariana Pajón

BMX UEC European Cup
 April 3 – October 18: BMX Cycling UEC European Cup 2015
 April 3 & 4: European Cup #1 in  Heusden-Zolder
 Men's Race #1 winner:  Connor Fields
 Men's Race #2 winner:  Niek Kimmann
 Men's Junior Race #1 winner:  Justin Kimmann
 Men's Junior Race #2 winner:  Romain Racine
 Women's Race #1 winner:  Felicia Stancil
 Women's Race #2 winner:  Stefany Hernández
 Women's Junior Race #1 winner:  Axelle Etienne
 Women's Junior Race #2 winner:  Axelle Etienne
 May 1 – 3: European Cup #2 in  Messigny-et-Vantoux
 Men's Race #1 winner:  Amidou Mir
 Men's Race #2 winner:  Niek Kimmann
 Men's Junior Race #1 winner:  Justin Kimmann
 Men's Junior Race #2 winner:  Romain Racine
 Women's Race #1 winner:  Stefany Hernández
 Women's Race #2 winner:  Stefany Hernández
 Women's Junior Race #1 winner  Louanne Juillerat
 Women's Junior Race #2 winner:  Louanne Juillerat
 June 5–7: European Cup #3 in  Bjerringbro
 Men's Race #1 winner:  Twan van Gendt
 Men's Race #2 winner:  Niek Kimmann
 Men's Junior Race #1 winner:  Romain Racine
 Men's Junior Race #2 winner:  Romain Racine
 Women's Race #1 winner:  Stefany Hernández
 Women's Race #2 winner:  Stefany Hernández
 Women's Junior Race #1 winner:  Yaroslava Bondarenko
 Women's Junior Race #2 winner:  Yaroslava Bondarenko
 September 18–20: European Cup #4 in  Échichens
 Men's Race #1 winner:  Edžus Treimanis
 Men's Race #2 winner:  David Graf
 Men's Junior Race #1 winner:  Bastien Claessens
 Men's Junior Race #2 winner:  Philip Schaub
 Women's Race #1 winner:  Elke Vanhoof
 Women's Race #2 winner:  Elke Vanhoof
 Women's Junior Race #1 winner:  Axelle Etienne
 Women's Junior Race #2 winner:  Axelle Etienne
 October 16–18: European Cup #5 (final) in  Manchester

Regional events
 March 22: BMX Cycling COPACI North American Championships 2015 in  Rock Hill, South Carolina
Men's Junior Race winner:  Collin Hudson
Men's Race winner:  Connor Fields
Women's Junior Race winner:  Kelsey Van Ogle
Women's Race winner:  Alise Post
 April 30: BMX Cycling OCC Oceanian Championships 2015 in  Brisbane
 Men's Junior Race winner:  Joshua McLean
 Men's Race winner:  Max Cairns
 Women's Junior Race winner:  Zoe Fleming
 Women's Race winner:  Lauren Reynolds
 May 23: BMX Cycling COPACI South American Championships in  Santiago
 Men's Junior Race winner:  Exequiel Torres
 Men's Race winner:  Carlos Oquendo
 Women's Junior Race winner:  Maria Paulina Osorno Calderon
 Women's Race winner:  Mariana Pajón
 May 24: BMX Cycling COPACI American Championships 2015 in  Santiago
 Men's Junior Race winner:  Leandro Noronha
 Men's Race winner:  Renato Rezende
 Women's Junior Race winner:  Maria Paulina Osorno Calderon
 Women's Race winner:  Mariana Pajón
 July 10–12: BMX Cycling UEC European Championships 2015 in  Erp
 Men's Race winner:  Twan van Gendt
 Men's Junior Race winner:  Mathijs Verhoeven
 Women's Race winner:  Elke Vanhoof
 Women's Junior Race winner:  Axelle Etienne
 October 31 – November 1: Asian BMX Championships in  Naypyitaw
 Men's Race winner:  Yoshitaku Nagasako
 Men's Junior Race winner:  Daichi Yamaguchi
 Women's Race winner:  Amanda Mildred Carr
 Women's Junior Race winner:  Sienna Fines

BMX World Championships and Test Event
 July 21–25: 2015 UCI BMX World Championships in  Heusden-Zolder
 Men's Elite winner:  Niek Kimmann
 Women's Elite winner:  Stefany Hernández
 Junior Men's winner:  Exequiel Torres
 Junior Women's winner:  Axelle Etienne
 Men's Elite Time Trial winner:  Joris Daudet
 Women's Elite Time Trial winner:  Mariana Pajón
 Junior Men's Time Trial winner:  Shane Rosa
 Junior Women's Time Trial winner:  Axelle Etienne
 Masters' winner:  Kelvin Batey
 Men's Elite winner:  Edžus Treimanis
 Women's Elite winner:  Mariana Pajón
 Junior Men's winner:  Exequiel Torres
 Junior Women's winner:  Axelle Etienne (default)

Cyclo-cross biking

UCI Cyclo-cross World Cup
 October 19, 2014 – January 25, 2015: 2014–2015 UCI Cyclo-cross World Cup
 October 19, 2014: World Cup #1 in  Valkenburg aan de Geul
 Men's Elite winner:  Lars van der Haar
 Women's Elite winner:  Katie Compton
 November 22, 2014: World Cup #2 in  Koksijde
 Men's Elite winner:  Wout van Aert
 Women's Elite winner:  Sanne Cant
 November 29, 2014: World Cup #3 in  Milton Keynes
 Men's Elite winner:  Kevin Pauwels
 Women's Elite winner:  Sanne Cant
 December 21, 2014: World Cup #4 in  Namur
 Men's Elite winner:  Kevin Pauwels
 Women's Elite winner:  Kateřina Nash
 December 26, 2014: World Cup #5 in  Heusden-Zolder
 Men's Elite winner:  Lars van der Haar
 Women's Elite winner:  Marianne Vos
 January 25, 2015: World Cup #6 (final) in  Hoogerheide
 Men's Elite winner:  Mathieu van der Poel
 Women's Elite winner:  Eva Lechner

UCI Cyclo-cross World Championships
 January 31 & February 1: 2015 UCI Cyclo-cross World Championships in  Tábor
 Men's Elite winner:  Mathieu van der Poel
 Women's Elite winner:  Pauline Ferrand-Prévot
 Men's U23 winner:  Michael Vanthourenhout
 Men's Junior winner:  Simon Andreassen

Mountain bike racing

UCI Mountain Bike World Cup
 April 11 – August 23: 2015 UCI Mountain Bike World Cup
 April 11 & 12: World Cup #1 (downhill only) in  Lourdes
 Men's Downhill winner:  Aaron Gwin
 Women's Downhill winner:  Emmeline Ragot
 Men's Junior Downhill winner:  Andrew Crimmins
 May 23 & 24: World Cup #2 (Olympic XC only) in  Nové Město na Moravě
 Men's Cross Country winner:  Jaroslav Kulhavý
 Women's Cross Country winner:  Jolanda Neff
 Men's Under 23 Cross Country winner:  Lars Forster
 Women's Under 23 Cross Country winner:  Jenny Rissveds
 May 30 & 31: World Cup #3 (Olympic XC only) in  Albstadt
 Men's Cross Country winner:  Julien Absalon
 Women's Cross Country winner:  Jolanda Neff
 Men's Under 23 Cross Country winner:  Pablo Rodríguez Guede
 Women's Under 23 Cross Country winner:  Jenny Rissveds
 June 6 & 7: World Cup #4 (downhill only) in  Fort William, Scotland
 Men's Downhill winner:  Greg Minnaar
 Women's Downhill winner:  Rachel Atherton
 Men's Junior Downhill winner:  Martin Maes
 June 13 & 14: World Cup #5 (downhill only) in  Leogang
 Men's Downhill winner:  Aaron Gwin
 Women's Downhill winner:  Rachel Atherton
 Men's Junior Downhill winner:  Andrew Crimmins
 July 4 & 5: World Cup #6 in  Lenzerheide
 Men's Downhill winner:  Greg Minnaar
 Women's Downhill winner:  Rachel Atherton
 Men's Junior Downhill winner:  Laurie Greenland
 Men's Cross Country winner:  Jaroslav Kulhavý
 Women's Cross Country winner:  Gunn-Rita Dahle Flesjå
 Men's U23 Cross Country winner:  Lars Forster
 August 1 & 2: World Cup #7 in  Mont-Sainte-Anne
 Men's Downhill winner:  Josh Bryceland
 Women's Downhill winner:  Rachel Atherton
 Men's Junior Downhill winner:  Laurie Greenland
 Men's Cross Country winner:  Nino Schurter
 Women's Cross Country winner:  Jolanda Neff
 Men's U23 Cross Country winner:  Titouan Carod
 Women's U23 Cross Country winner:  Jenny Rissveds
 August 8 & 9: World Cup #8 in  Windham, New York
 Men's Downhill winner:  Aaron Gwin
 Women's Downhill winner:  Rachel Atherton
 Men's Junior Downhill winner:  Laurie Greenland
 Men's Cross Country winner:  Nino Schurter
 Women's Cross Country winner:  Pauline Ferrand-Prévot
 Men's U23 Cross Country winner:  Victor Koretzky
 Women's U23 Cross Country winner:  Jenny Rissveds
 August 22 & 23: World Cup #9 (final) in  Val di Sole
 Men's Downhill winner:  Aaron Gwin
 Women's Downhill winner:  Rachel Atherton
 Men's Junior Downhill winner:  Loris Revelli
 Men's Cross Country winner:  Nino Schurter
 Women's Cross Country winner:  Annika Langvad
 Men's U23 Cross Country winner:  Grant Ferguson
 Women's U23 Cross Country winner:  Jenny Rissveds

World mountain bike championships
 June 27: 2015 UCI Mountain Bike Marathon World Championships in  Sëlva
 Men's Elite Cross Country Marathon winner:  Alban Lakata
 Women's Elite Cross Country Marathon winner:  Gunn-Rita Dahle Flesjå
 August 31 – September 6: 2015 UCI Mountain Bike & Trials World Championships in  Vallnord
 Men
 Men's Cross Country winner:  Nino Schurter
 Men's Under 23 Cross Country winner:  Anton Cooper
 Men's Junior Cross Country winner:  Simon Andreassen
 Men's Cross Country Eliminator winner:  Daniel Federspiel
 Men's Downhill winner:  Loïc Bruni
 Men's Junior Downhill winner:  Laurie Greenland
 Men's Trials 20" winner:  Abel Mustieles
 Men's Junior Trials 20" winner:  Dominik Oswald
 Men's Trials 26" winner:  Vincent Hermance
 Men's Junior Trials 26" winner:  Nicolas Vallée
 Women
 Women's Cross Country winner:  Pauline Ferrand-Prévot
 Women's Under 23 Cross Country winner:  Ramona Forchini
 Women's Junior Cross Country winner:  Martina Berta
 Women's Cross Country Eliminator winner:  Linda Indergand
 Women's Downhill winner:  Rachel Atherton
 Women's Junior Downhill winner:  Marine Cabirou
 Women's Trials winner:  Janine Jungfels
 Team
 Mixed Cross Country Team Relay winners:  (Victor Koretzky, Jordan Sarrou, Pauline Ferrand-Prévot, Antoine Philipp)
 Open Team Trials winners:  (Vincent Hermance, Nicolas Fleury, Benjamin Durville, Manon Basseville, Nicolas Vallee)

Other mountain biking events
 February 24 – 27: 2015 Oceania Mountain Bike Championships in  Toowoomba
 Men's Cross Country Eliminator winner:  Anton Cooper
 Men's Cross Country (XCO) winner:  Daniel McConnell
 Women's Cross Country (XCO) winner:  Rebecca Henderson
 Men's Downhill winner:  Connor Fearon
 Women's Downhill winner:  Tegan Molloy
 Men's Junior Cross Country winner:  Liam Jeffries
 Women's Junior Cross Country winner:  Jemma Manchester
 Men's Under 23 Cross Country (XCO) winner:  Scott Bowden
 Women's Under 23 Cross Country (XCO) winner:  Amber Johnston
 March 25–29: 2015 American Mountain Bike Continental Championships in  Cota
 Men's Cross Country winner:  Henrique Avancini
 Men's Under 23 Cross Country winner:  Howard Grotts
 Women's Cross Country winner:  Daniela Campuzano
 Women's Under 23 Cross Country winner:  Kate Courtney
 Women's Downhill winner  Mariana Salazar Palomo
 Men's Junior Downhill winner:  Diego Hincapie
 Men's Downhill winner:  Neco Mulally 
 Men's Cross Country Eliminator winner:  Luiz Henrique Cocuzzi
 Women's Cross Country Eliminator winner:  Xiomara Guerrero
 Mixed Cross Country Team Relay winners:  (Jhon Freddy Garzon, Brandon Rivera, Laura Abril, Fabio Hernando Castaneda Monsalve)
 May 5 – 10: 2015 African MTB Continental Championships in  Ruhengeri
 Men's Junior Cross Country winner:  Tristan de Lange
 Women's Junior Cross Country winner:  Skye Davidson
 Men's Cross Country winner:  James Reid
 Women's Cross Country winner:  Bianca Haw
 May 10: 2015 European MTB Continental Championships in  Singen
 Men's Cross-Country Marathon winner:  Jaroslav Kulhavý
 Women's Cross-Country Marathon winner:  Sabine Spitz
 June 20–21: 2015 UEC MTB Enduro European Championships in  Kirchberg in Tirol/Brixental
 Men Elite:  Jérôme Clémentz 
 Men Juniors Daniel Schemmel 
 Men Masters 30+  René Wildhaber 
 Men Masters 40+  Remo Heutschi
 Men Masters 50+  Carsten Geck
 Women Masters  Antje Kramer
 Women Elite  Anneke Beerten
 July 20–26: 2015 European MTB Continental Championships in  Chies d'Alpago
 Men's Cross Country winner:  Julien Absalon
 Women's Cross Country winner:  Jolanda Neff
 Men's Under 23 Cross Country winner:  Pablo Rodriguez Guede
 Women's Cross Country Eliminator winner:  Kathrin Stirnemann
 Men's Trials 20" winner:  Benito Ros Charral
 Men's Trials 26" winner:  Jack Carthy
 Men's Cross Country Eliminator winner:  Jeroen Van Eck
 Women's Under 23 Cross Country winner:  Perrine Clauzel
 Men's Junior Trials 20" winner:  Dominik Oswald
 Men's Junior Cross Country winner:  Simon Andreassen
 Women's Junior Cross Country winner:  Sina Frei
 Men's Junior Trials 26" winner:  Nicolas Vallée
 Women's Trials winner:  Tatiana Janickova
 Mixed Cross Country Team Relay winners:  (Maximilian Brandl, Ben Zwiehoff, Helen Grobert, Manuel Fumic)
 August 12–16: 2015 Asian Mountain Bike Continental Championships in 
 Men's Cross Country winner:  Kohei Yamamoto
 Women's Cross Country winner:  Ren Chengyuan
 Women's Junior Cross Country winner:  Warinothorn Phetpraphan
 Men's Junior Cross Country winner:  Ryo Takeuchi
 Men's Downhill winner:  Sheng-Shan Chiang
 Women's Downhill winner:  Vipavee Deekaballes
 Mixed Cross Country Team Relay winners:  (Patompob Phonarjthan, Peerapol Chawchiangkwang, Supaksorn Nuntana, Warinothorn Phetpraphan)
 Men's winner:  Nino Schurter
 Women's winner:  Eva Lechner

Road cycling
 January 17 – October 4: 2015 UCI World Tour
 Overall winner:  Alejandro Valverde ( Movistar Team)
 March 14 – August 29: 2015 UCI Women's Road World Cup
 Overall winner:  Lizzie Armitstead ( Boels–Dolmans Cycling Team)

Grand Tour
 May 9–31: 2015 Giro d'Italia
 Winner:  Alberto Contador (second Giro d'Italia win; seventh overall Grand Tour win)
 July 4–26: 2015 Tour de France
 Winner:  Chris Froome (second Tour de France and overall Grand Tour wins)
 August 22 – September 13: 2015 Vuelta a España
 Winner:  Fabio Aru (first Vuelta a España and overall Grand Tour win)

One-Day Races
 March 22: 2015 Milan–San Remo in 
 Winner:  John Degenkolb ( Team Giant-Alpecin)
 March 27: 2015 E3 Harelbeke in 
 Winner:  Geraint Thomas ( Team Sky)
 March 29: 2015 Gent–Wevelgem (Gent – Wevelgem in Flanders Fields) in 
 Winner:  Luca Paolini ( Team Katusha)
 Men's winner:  Alexander Kristoff ( Team Katusha)
 Women's winner:  Elisa Longo Borghini ( Wiggle–Honda)
 April 12: 2015 Paris–Roubaix in 
 Winner:  John Degenkolb ( Team Giant-Alpecin)
 April 19: 2015 Amstel Gold Race in the 
 Winner:  Michał Kwiatkowski ( Etixx–Quick-Step)
 Men's winner:  Alejandro Valverde ( Movistar Team)
 Women's winner:  Anna van der Breggen ( Rabo–Liv Women Cycling Team)
 April 26: 2015 Liège–Bastogne–Liège in 
 Winner:  Alejandro Valverde ( Movistar Team)
 August 1: 2015 Clásica de San Sebastián in 
 Winner:  Adam Yates ( Orica–GreenEDGE)
 August 23: 2015 Vattenfall Cyclassics in  Hamburg
 Winner:  André Greipel ( Lotto–Soudal)
 August 30: 2015 GP Ouest-France in  Plouay
 Winner:  Alexander Kristoff ( Team Katusha)
 September 11: 2015 Grand Prix Cycliste de Québec in  Quebec City
 Winner:  Rigoberto Urán ( Etixx–Quick-Step)
 September 13: 2015 Grand Prix Cycliste de Montréal in 
 Winner:  Tim Wellens ( Lotto–Soudal)
 October 5: 2015 Il Lombardia in 
 Winner:  Vincenzo Nibali ( Astana Pro Team)

UCI Para-cycling Road World Cup
 June 5 – September 13: 2015 UCI Para-cycling Road World Cup
 June 5–7: World Cup #1 in  Maniago
 For results, click here.
 June 13–16: World Cup #2 in  Yverdon-les-Bains
 Click at the "here" word above for results.
 July 24–26: World Cup #3 in  Elzach
 Click at the "here" word above for results.
 September 11–13: World Cup #4 (final) in  Pietermaritzburg
 Click at the "here" word above for results.

Other road cycling championships and events
 May 7 – 9: 2015 Pan American Road Cycling Championships for Women in  León, Guanajuato
 Individual Road Race winner:  Marlies Mejías
 Individual Time Trial winner:  Carmen Small
 July 28 – August 2: 2015 UCI Para-cycling Road World Championships in  Nottwil
 For results, click here.
 August 6–9: 2015 European Road Championships (under 23 and juniors only) in  Tartu
  won the gold medal tally.
 Winner:  Alexis Vuillermoz
 September 19–27: 2015 UCI Road World Championships in  Richmond, Virginia
 Men's Road Race winner:  Peter Sagan
 Men's Individual Time Trial winner:  Vasil Kiryienka
 Women's Road Race winner:  Lizzie Armitstead
 Women's Time Trial winner:  Linda Villumsen
 Men's Under 23 Road Race winner:  Kévin Ledanois
 Men's Under 23 Individual Time Trial winner:  Mads Würtz Schmidt
 Men's Junior Road Race winner:  Felix Gall
 Men's Junior Individual Time Trial winner:  Leo Appelt
 Women's Junior Road Race winner:  Chloé Dygert
 Women's Junior Individual Time Trial winner:  Chloé Dygert
 Women's Team Time Trial  Velocio–SRAM Pro Cycling (Alena Amialiusik, Lisa Brennauer, Karol-Ann Canuel, Barbara Guarischi, Mieke Kröger, Trixi Worrack)
 Men's Team Time Trial  BMC Racing Team (Rohan Dennis, Silvan Dillier, Stefan Küng, Daniel Oss, Taylor Phinney, Manuel Quinziato)

Track cycling

TC World Cup
 November 8, 2014 – January 18, 2015: 2014–15 UCI Track Cycling World Cup
 November 8 & 9, 2014: World Cup #1 in  Guadalajara
  won both the gold and overall medal tallies.
 December 5–7, 2014: World Cup #2 in  London
  and  won 3 gold medals each. Germany won the overall medal tally.
 January 17 & 18, 2015: World Cup #3 (final) in  Cali

 The  and  won 2 gold medals each. The Netherlands won the overall medal tally.

Other track cycling championships
 August 8–12, 2014: 2014 UCI Juniors Track World Championships in  Seoul
  won both the gold and overall medal tallies.
 October 4–11, 2014: UCI Track Cycling Masters World Championships in  Manchester
 Host nation, won both the gold and overall medal tallies.
 January 21–25: Track Cycling CAC African Championships 2015 in  Pietermaritzburg

  won both the gold and overall medal tallies.
 January 21–25: 2015 UCI African Continental Championships (Track Para-cycling) in  Pietermaritzburg
 Men's C3 – 1000m Time Trial winner:  Juan Odendaal
 Men's C5 – 1000m Time Trial winner:  Dane Wilson (default)
 Men's C3 – 3 km Pursuit winner:  Craig Ridgard
 Men's C5 – 4 km Pursuit winner:  Dane Wilson (default)
 Women's C4 – 500m Time Trial winner:  Roxanne Burns (default)
 Women's C4 – 3 km Pursuit winner:  Roxanne Burns (default)
 February 18 – 22: 2015 UCI Track Cycling World Championships in  Saint-Quentin-en-Yvelines
** Host nation, won the gold medal tally.  won the overall medal tally.
 March 26–29: 2015 UCI Para-cycling Track World Championships in  Apeldoorn
 Men:  won both the gold and overall medal tallies.
 Women:  and  won 3 gold medals each. The  won the overall medal tally.
 April 13–17: Track Cycling COPACI Junior American Championships 2015 in  Aguascalientes
 
  won both the gold and overall medal tallies.
 July 14–19: 2015 European Track Championships (under-23 & junior) in  Athens
  won both the gold and overall medal tallies.
 August 21 & 22: 2015 UEC Derny Track Cycling European Championships in  Hanover
 Winner:  Kenny De Ketele
 October 8–11: Track Cycling OCC Oceanian Championships 2015 in  Invercargill
  won both the gold and overall medal tallies.
 October 14–18: 2015 UEC European Track Championships  in  Grenchen

  won the gold medal tally. Great Britain and the  won 9 overall medals each.

Trial cycling
 May 30 – September 27: 2015 UCI Trials World Cup
 May 30 & 31: World Cup #1 in  Kraków
 Note: The Men's Elite 20" and the Women's Elite events were cancelled here.
 Men's Elite 26" winner:  Jack Carthy
 August 8 & 9: World Cup #2 in  Vöcklabruck
 Men's Elite 20" winner:  Benito Ros
 Men's Elite 26" winner:  Jack Carthy
 Women's Elite winner:  Tatiana Janickova
 August 22 & 23: World Cup #3 in  Albertville
 Men's Elite 20" winner:  Abel Mustieles
 Men's Elite 26" winner:  Gilles Coustellier
 Women's Elite winner:  Tatiana Janickova
 September 26 & 27: World Cup #4 (final) in  Antwerp
 Men's Elite 20" winner:  Benito Ros
 Men's Elite 26" winner:  Jack Carthy
 Women's Elite winner:  Janine Jungfels
 August 31 – September 6: 2015 UCI Trials World Championships in  Vallnord
 Click here for results.

References

 
2015 in sports
Cycle sport by year
Test events for the 2016 Summer Olympic and Paralympic Games